Ksenija Lukich or in Serbian Ksenija Lukić (born 12 February 1990) is a Serbian-Australian model and television presenter. She is of Serbian descent and her parents are originally from Serbia and moved to Australia.

Lukich grew up on the Northern Beaches and attended SCECGS Redlands and the University of Sydney. In 2014, she won a contest to become the host of E! Australia.

On 23 October 2016, Lukich married Dan Bragg in a traditional Serbian Orthodox church service.

References

External links
 

Living people
1990 births
Australian female models
Models from Sydney
Australian people of Serbian descent
Australian television presenters
University of Sydney alumni
Australian women television presenters
Members of the Serbian Orthodox Church